Brooklyn Store and Post Office is a historic country store and post office located at Brooklyn, Halifax County, Virginia. It was built about 1850, and is a two-story, frame building.  It features a Greek Revival pedimented front gable with its flush-board tympanum. The store operated in conjunction with the nearby Brooklyn Tobacco Factory, serving the small community of Brooklyn and surrounding farms. The store and post office remained in operation until 1903.

It was listed on the National Register of Historic Places in 1996.

References

Commercial buildings on the National Register of Historic Places in Virginia
Post office buildings on the National Register of Historic Places in Virginia
Government buildings completed in 1850
Buildings and structures in Halifax County, Virginia
National Register of Historic Places in Halifax County, Virginia